Naomi Sue Cline (May 28, 1946 – December 29, 2021) was an American politician who served as a member of the West Virginia Senate for the 9th district from 2016 to 2020. Cline died on December 29, 2021, at the age of 75.

Election results

References

External links
West Virginia Legislature - Senator Sue Cline official government website
Project Vote Smart - Senator Sue Cline (WV) profile

1946 births
2021 deaths
21st-century American politicians
21st-century American women politicians
People from Welch, West Virginia
People from Wyoming County, West Virginia
Businesspeople from West Virginia
Republican Party West Virginia state senators
Women state legislators in West Virginia
Bluefield State College alumni
Concord University alumni
Pennsylvania State University alumni